Diên Khánh is a township and capital of Diên Khánh District, Khánh Hòa Province, Vietnam. It was established in 1981.

References

Communes of Khánh Hòa province
Populated places in Khánh Hòa province
District capitals in Vietnam
Townships in Vietnam